Lock Wood Island is an island in the River Thames in England just downstream of Nuneham House on the reach above Abingdon Lock.

The island sits on a sharp bend in the river. It is densely covered with tall trees  and has a narrow channel behind it. In the nineteenth century there was a thatched cottage on the island linked to the bank by a rustic bridge which was a popular place for picknickers. Alice Liddell used to visit the island with Lewis Carroll, who penned Through the Looking-Glass shortly after one of these visits. There is evidence of weirs and flash locks here, at one time owned by Lord Harcourt, which may account for the name of the island.

See also
Islands in the River Thames

References

Islands of Oxfordshire
Islands of the River Thames